The NCAA Division I Rowing Championship is a rowing championship held by the NCAA for Division I women's heavyweight (or openweight) collegiate crews. The inaugural National Championship was held in 1997 for the top 16 crews in the country, located at Lake Natoma, Sacramento, California. In 2002, the NCAA added championships for Division II and Division III. The NCAA does not sponsor men's rowing (both heavyweight and lightweight) and women's lightweight rowing championships.

Automatic qualifier spots 
Eleven rowing conferences each get one Automatic Qualifier spot by winning their conference points championship, except for the Ivy League whose Automatic Qualifier goes to the Varsity Eight winner. There are another 11 At-Large spots.
Pac-12
Big 12
Ivy League
Big Ten
ACC
Atlantic 10
AAC
Colonial
Patriot League
West Coast
MAAC

Format 
The NCAA Division I Women's Rowing Championships have three events (I Eights, II Eights, Fours), and twenty-two teams compete. Eleven teams are selected through automatic qualification based on conference results. An additional eleven at-large teams are selected by the NCAA Rowing Committee. In previous years an additional, four at-large I Eights are selected. As of 2009 all bids must be full teams. Teams are awarded points by their final placing in each event. The NCAA Champion is determined by the team which accumulates the most points. When teams are tied for points after the three events, the NCAA champion is determined by the team with the higher placing in the I Eight event.

At-large participants in the championships are selected by the NCAA Division I Women’s Rowing Committee. The following criteria are used in selecting teams and individual boats:

Regional championship results. 
Regional ranking. 
Late season performance. 
Head-to-head results. 
Results versus team already selected. 
Results versus common opponents. 
Results versus regionally ranked team.

Champions

Results

Team titles

Prior Championships

The first women’s collegiate championship was held in 1980 at Oak Ridge, Tennessee. National champions were declared from the varsity eight race. California won the first collegiate championship. Below is a list of Women’s National Collegiate varsity eight champions:

 1996 – Brown
 1995 – Princeton
 1994 – Princeton
 1993 – Princeton
 1992 – Boston University
 1991 – Boston University
 1990 – Princeton
 1989 – Cornell
 1988 – Washington
 1987 – Washington
 1986 – Wisconsin
 1985 – Washington
 1984 – Washington
 1983 – Washington
 1982 – Washington (AIAW champion)
 1981 – Washington 
 1980 – California

(Source: Washington Crew Press Guide)

Prior to 1980, college boats entered the National Women’s Rowing Association National Championships (what is now the USRowing National Championships). Below is a list of NWRA open eights champions from 1971–79 (no eights prior to 1971). The top college finisher is in parentheses:

 1979 – Burnaby BC (top college Yale)
 1978 – Burnaby BC (top college Wisconsin)
 1977 – Vesper Boat Club (top college Wisconsin) 
 1976 – College Boat Club (top college Wisconsin) 
 1975 – University of Wisconsin 
 1974 – Vesper Boat Club (top college Radcliffe) 
 1973 – Radcliffe College 
 1972 – College Boat Club (top college Washington)
 1971 – Vesper Boat Club (top college Washington)

Winning crews

I Eight
1997 — Sabina Telenska, Denni Nessler, Kelly Horton, Katy Dunnet, Annie Christie, Jan Williamson, Tristine Glick, Kari Green, Alida Purves (cox), Head Coach: Jan Harville
1998 — Sabina Telenska, Denni Nessler, Kelly Horton, Katy Dunnet, Annie Christie, Rachel Dunnet, Vanessa Tavalero, Kari Green, Missy Collins (cox), Head Coach: Jan Harville
1999 — Caroline Grogan, Erin Kelley, Amy Meyers, Nina Carter, Kellie Walker, Anda Adams, Rachel Anderson, Portia Johnson (Portia McGee), Kate Saul (cox), Head Coach: John Murphy
2000 — Portia Johnson (Portia McGee), Rachel Anderson, Anda Adams, Kellie Walker, Jessica Lanning, Liane Malcos, Erin Kelley, Caroline Grogan, Kate Saul (cox), Head Coach: John Murphy
2001 — Annabel Ritchie, Nicole Rogers, Carrie Stasiak, Adrienne Hunter, Rika Geyser, Anna Mickelson, Nicole Borges, Lauren Estevenin, Mary Whipple (cox), Head Coach: Jan Harville
2002 — Lauren Estevenin, Annabel Ritchie, Anna Mickelson, Heidi Hurn, Adrienne Hunter, Carrie Stasiak, Kara Nykreim, Yvonneke Stenken, Mary Whipple (cox), Head Coach: Jan Harville
2003 — Sarah Marvel, Courtney Brown, Caryn Davies, Anna Brock, Lis Lambert, Heather Schofield, Caroline Fisher, Tasha Pasternack, Julie Gluck (cox), Head Coach: Liz O'Leary
2004 — Deborah Dryer, Meg Anderson, Catherine Starr, Karen Prazar, Rachel Dearborn, Natalia Obolensky, Marie Walcott, Gillian Almy, Mira Mehta (cox), Head Coach: John Murphy
2005 — Jelena Djukic, Kaylan Vander Schilden, Laura Terheyden, Kim Atkinson, Iva Obradović, Erin Reinhardt, Mara Allen, Erin Cafaro, Remy Hitomi (cox), Head Coach: Dave O'Neill
2006 — Caroline Lind, Kristin Haraldsdottir, Jackie Zider, Devan Darby, Andréanne Morin, Carrie Kruse, Genevra Stone, Kathleen Bertko, Elizabeth Agnew (cox), Head Coach: Lori Dauphiny 
2007 — Rachel Jeffers, Tess Gerrand, Christine Geiser, Jamie Redman, Taylor Ritzel, Amanda Rich, Alice Henly, Christine Glandorf, Emily Cleveland (cox), Head Coach: Will Porter 
2008 — Taylor Ritzel, Christina Person, Tess Gerrand, Jamie Redman, Alice Henly, Maren McCrea, Caroline Nash,  Christine Glandorf, Mia Kanak (cox), Head Coach: Will Porter 
2009 — Erika Roddy, Di Eaton, Elle Logan, Grace Luczak, Julie Smith, Lindsay Meyer, Michelle Vezie, Adrienne Fritsch, Jenna Levy (cox), Head Coach: Yasmin Farooq
2010 — Taylor Ritzel, Tess Gerrand, Alice Henly, Maren McCrea, Caroline Nash, Catherine Hart, Stephanie Madner, Dara Dickson, Mia Kanak (cox), Head Coach: Will Porter 
2011 — Lauren Wilkinson, Kelsey Reelick, Emily Reynolds, Michaela Strand, Heidi Robbins, Kelly Pierce, Molly Hamrick, Ashton Brown, Lila Flavin (cox), Head Coach: Lori Dauphiny
2012 — Keziah Beall, Martha Kuzzy, Kristine O'Brien, Sarah Cowburn, Fiona Schlesinger, Susanne Grainger, Hemingway Benton, Carli Goldberg, Sidney Thorsten (cox), Head Coach: Kevin Sauer
2013 — Agatha Nowinski, Erica Rippe, Paparangi Hipango, Kara Kohler, Jenn Helssen, Kendall Chase, Maggie Simpson, Clair Premzic, Rachel Ersted (cox), Head Coach: Dave O'Neill
2014 — Claire-Louise Bode, Holly Norton, Catherine Shields, Stephanie Williams, Ashley Bauer, Eelkje Miedema, Elodie Ravera, Aina Cid Centelles, Victoria Lazur (cox), Head Coach: Andy Teitelbaum
2015 —  Rachel Engel, Aina Cid Centelles, Anna Ralph, Stephanie Williams, Ashley Bauer, Sarah Davis, Catherine Shields, Holly Norton, Sami Jurofsky (cox), Head Coach: Andy Teitelbaum
2016 — Sarah Davis, Catherine Shields, Stephanie Williams, Anne Dietrich, Cassandra Johnson, Anna Ralph, Alice Riley, Rachel Engel, Sarah Asad (cox), Head Coach: Andy Teitelbaum
2017 — Chiara Ondoli, Elise Beuke, Brooke Pierson, Katy Gillingham, Brooke Mooney, Tabea Schendekehl, Jess Thoennes, Annemieke Schanze, Phoebe Marks-Nicholes (cox), Head Coach: Yasmin Farooq
2018 — Charlotte Wesselman, Mia Croonquist, Juliane Faralisch, Dana Moffat, Chloe Betts, Maddison Brown, Sydney Payne, Bea Bliemel, Hannah Christopher (cox), Head Coach: Al Acosta
2019 — Carmela Pappalardo, Jennifer Wren, Valentina Iseppi, Teal Cohen, Marlee Blue, Sofia Asoumanaki, Calina Schanze, Tabea Schendekehl, Marley Avritt (cox), Head Coach: Yasmin Farooq
2021 — Kate Knifton (Stroke), Fran Raggi, Alex Watson, Aspa Christodoulidis, Daisy Mazzio-Manson, Anna Jensen, Lisa Gutfleisch (Bow), Rachel Rane (Cox), Head Coach : Dave Oneill

See also
Intercollegiate Rowing Association
Intercollegiate Women's Varsity Eights
Intercollegiate Rowing Association Women's Varsity Lightweight Eights Champions
NCAA Division II Rowing Championship
NCAA Division III Rowing Championship

References

External links
NCAA Division I Rowing

Rowing
College rowing competitions in the United States
Women's rowing in the United States
NCAA Women's Row